This list is ordered by the number of carbon atoms in an alcohol.

C1
 Methanol

C2
 Ethanol

C3

 1-Propanol
 Allyl alcohol
 Isopropyl alcohol

C4

 n-Butanol
 Isobutanol
 sec-Butanol
 tert-Butyl alcohol

C5

 1-Pentanol
 Isoamyl alcohol
 2-Methyl-1-butanol
 Neopentyl alcohol
 2-Pentanol
 3-Methyl-2-butanol
 3-Pentanol
 tert-Amyl alcohol

C6

 1-Hexanol
 2-Hexanol
 3-Hexanol
 2-Methyl-1-pentanol
 3-Methyl-1-pentanol
 4-Methyl-1-pentanol
 2-Methyl-2-pentanol
 3-Methyl-2-pentanol
 4-Methyl-2-pentanol
 2-Methyl-3-pentanol
 3-Methyl-3-pentanol
 2,2-Dimethyl-1-butanol
 2,3-Dimethyl-1-butanol
 3,3-Dimethyl-1-butanol

 
Alcohols